Erigeron pseudoseravschanicus is an Asian species of flowering plants in the family Asteraceae. It grows on alpine meadows and forest margins in Xinjiang, Kazakhstan, Uzbekistan, and Siberia.

Erigeron pseudoseravschanicus is a perennial, clumping-forming herb up to 60 cm (5 feet) tall, forming a thick woody rhizomes. Its flower heads have pink or lilac ray florets surrounding yellow disc florets.

References

pseudoseravschanicus
Flora of Asia
Plants described in 1959
Taxa named by Victor Botchantsev